Busuioacă de Bohotin is a grape which originates from the Bohotin region, in Southeast Iași County, Romania, and is also cultivated in other small areas: Huși in Vaslui County, Pietroasele in Buzău County, and Tohani in Prahova County, on a total area of no more than .

The wine has a light red color. Its flavor resembles honeysuckle and ripe juicy peaches. The sweet taste sometimes has a barely perceptible almond like bitter aroma caused by the latent cyanide moiety.

Description
Busuioaca is a liqueur wine with a special body, with an unmistakable fragrance, a mixture of rose and basil giving it a special note, rarely found in other aromatic wines. Its aroma is unique, bringing honeysuckle and peach ripe, succulent, with perfect harmony of sugar, alcohol and acidity. Sweet taste sometimes has a bitter sensuous taste of almonds.

The Busuioaca de Bohotin variety is grown in four viticultural centers: Bohotin, Iași County, Huși, Vaslui County, Pietroasele, Buzău County, and Tohani, Prahova County. If we gather the area cultivated with this variety in the four wine-growing centers, we have about 100 hectares, which makes the national production of authentic wine of Busuioaca de Bohotin very little.

See also
Romanian wine

References

Red wine grape varieties
Grape varieties of Romania